Monotaxis grandoculis, the humpnose big-eye bream, bigeye barenose, bigeye bream, or bigeye emperor, is a species of emperor fish native to the Indian Ocean and the West and Central Pacific Ocean to the Hawaiian Islands. This species can reach a length of  TL though most do not exceed . This species is commercially important as a food fish and is also popular as a game fish. It can also be found in the aquarium trade.

References

Lethrinidae
Fish of the Indian Ocean
Fish of the Pacific Ocean
Fish of Palau
Fish described in 1775
Taxa named by Peter Forsskål